Manuel Santana was the defending champion, but did not participate this year.

Rod Laver won the title, defeating Tony Roche 7–5, 6–4, 6–4 in the final.

Seeds

 Rod Laver (champion)
 Arthur Ashe (first round)
 Tony Roche (final)
 Ken Rosewall (semifinals)
 John Newcombe (second round)
 Tom Okker (semifinals)
 Pancho Gonzales (quarterfinals)
 Roy Emerson (first round)

Draw

Finals

Top half

Bottom half

External links
 Main draw

U.S. Pro Indoor